The Holy Man ( or Luang Phii Teng) is a 2005 Thai religious comedy film. One of the top films at the Thai box office that year, it starred popular Thai television comedian, Pongsak Pongsuwan as a Buddhist monk. It is the first of a comic trilogy about young monks.

Synopsis
A monk comes to a small city and takes up residence at a small Buddhist temple. With his no-nonsense advice and humble ways, a new monk builds a following that starts to rival a flashy scam temple across town, making an enemy of its operator (Somlek Sakdikul).

Cast 
 Pongsak Pongsuwan
 Note Chernyim
 Sarawut Poomthong
 Sawika Chaiyadech

Casting
Another popular comic, Petchtai Wongkamlao, is featured in a small role.

References

External links 
 

2005 films
2005 comedy films
Thai comedy films
Thai-language films
Films about Buddhism